Ayaviri or Ayawiri (Aymara) is one of nine districts of the province Melgar in Peru.

Geography 
Some of the highest mountains of the district are listed below:

References